Mart Adamson (9 November 1892 in Viiratsi – 20 January 1975) was an Estonian politician. He was a member of III and IV Riigikogu, representing the Estonian Socialist Workers' Party. He was a member of the Riigikogu since 15 October 1926. He replaced Aksel Herman Rüütli.

References

1892 births
1975 deaths
Estonian Socialist Workers' Party politicians
Members of the Riigikogu, 1926–1929
Members of the Riigikogu, 1929–1932
People from Viljandi Parish
People from Kreis Fellin